John Plumb may be:

 John Plumb (1927–2008), British abstract painter
 John Plumb (politician) (1846–1891), Australian politician
 John H. Plumb (1911–2001), British historian
 John Plumbe (sometimes Plumb; 1809–1857), Welsh-born American photographer, gallerist, and publisher